James Alexander Singleton (born July 20, 1981) is an American former professional basketball player and former assistant coach of the Austin Spurs of the NBA G League. The 6'8" forward played two years of college basketball for Murray State.

College career
During his college career, Singleton, a graduate of Chicago's Hirsch High School, attended Pearl River Community College and Murray State University. In his two years at Murray State, he averaged 13.5 points, 10.5 rebounds and 1.9 blocks in 60 games. He earned second-team All-Ohio Valley Conference honors in 2001–02 and first-team honors in 2002–03. He also led the OVC in rebounds as a senior.

Professional career
Undrafted by an NBA franchise, Singleton began his professional career in Italy playing with the Sicc Cucine Jesi (Lega2) during the 2003–04 season, averaging 20.8 points and 12 rebounds per game. He won the Lega2 title with his team which allowed Jesi there appear in Serie A. He also received Eurobasket All-Italian Lega2 Player of the Year award.

He later signed with the Olimpia Milano (Serie A) team. He averaged 11.5 points, 8.6 rebounds and two steals in 46 games during the 2004–05 season, helping his team reach the Italian SerieA League Finals. He was named Most Valuable Player of the 2005 Italian League All-Star Game. During his tenure, Singleton was a fan favorite for his high-flying acrobatics and his tenacious defense.

He was signed on August 30, 2005 by the Los Angeles Clippers to a two-year contract. This period marked his first appearance in the NBA.

Singleton joined the ACB for the 2007–08 season with TAU Cerámica. He won the ACB title with this team, beating F.C. Barcelona in the Finals (3–0).

Achieving success in Europe again Singleton returned for his second opportunity in the NBA as several teams took notice of his marked improvement. He would end up joining the Dallas Mavericks.

On February 13, 2010, Singleton was traded from the Dallas Mavericks to the Washington Wizards along with Drew Gooden, Josh Howard and Quinton Ross for Caron Butler, Brendan Haywood, and DeShawn Stevenson.

On September 6, 2010, The Washington Post reported that Singleton had rejected a contract offer from the Wizards and signed with the Xinjiang Flying Tigers of the Chinese Basketball Association in which he helped lead the team to the CBA finals.

Singleton joined the Guangdong Southern Tigers for the 2011–12 season and helped lead the team to the CBA Finals. After the CBA season ended, he returned to the Washington Wizards. Later in 2012, he returned to the Xinjiang Flying Tigers signing a two-year contract with the club.

Taking time off from basketball for the birth of his son, Singleton was acquired by the Canton Charge on January 29, 2015. On May 8, he signed with Guaros de Lara of the Venezuelan Liga Profesional de Baloncesto (LPB).

On August 13, 2015, Singleton signed with Bnei Herzliya of the Israeli Ligat HaAl.

On August 7, 2016, he signed with Maccabi Kiryat Gat. He left Kiryat Gat after appearing in eight games, and on December 20, 2016, he signed with Seoul SK Knights of the Korean Basketball League.

NBA career statistics

Regular season

|-
|align="left"| 
|align="left"| L.A. Clippers
| 59 || 10 || 12.8 || .510 || .500 || .780 || 3.3 || .5 || .3 || .4 || 3.4
|-
|align="left"| 
|align="left"| L.A. Clippers
| 53 || 0 || 7.1 || .366 || .214 || .759 || 2.0 || .3 || .3 || .3 || 1.6
|-
|align="left"| 
|align="left"| Dallas
| 62 || 6 || 14.3 || .529 || .325 || .859 || 4.0 || .3 || .4 || .5 || 5.1
|-
|align="left"| 
|align="left"| Dallas
| 25 || 0 || 8.4 || .375 || .227 || 1.000 || 2.2 || .4 || .4 || .3 || 2.4
|-
|align="left"| 
|align="left"| Washington
| 32 || 3 || 23.9 || .384 || .133 || .839 || 6.9 || .7 || .5 || 1.1 || 6.1
|-
|align="left"| 
|align="left"| Washington
| 12 || 0 || 21.8 || .547 || .222 || .933 || 6.8 || 1.3 || .8 || .7 || 8.2
|-class="sortbottom"
|align="center" colspan="2"| Career
| 243 || 19 || 13.4 || .462 || .292 || .833 || 3.7 || .4 || .4 || .5 || 3.9

Playoffs

|-
|align="left"| 2006
|align="left"| L.A. Clippers
| 7 || 0 || 1.7 || .333 || .000 || .000 || .4 || .3 || .0 || .0 || .3
|-
|align="left"| 2009
|align="left"| Dallas
| 9 || 0 || 4.7 || .500 || .400 || .000 || .7 || .0 || .0 || .1 || 1.3
|-class="sortbottom"
|align="center" colspan="2"| Career
| 16 || 0 || 3.4 || .462 || .286 || .000 || .6 || .1 || .0 || .1 || .9

References

External links 

ESPN.com profile
Euroleague.net profile

1981 births
Living people
African-American basketball players
American expatriate basketball people in China
American expatriate basketball people in Israel
American expatriate basketball people in Italy
American expatriate basketball people in South Korea
American expatriate basketball people in Spain
American expatriate basketball people in Venezuela
American men's basketball players
Basketball coaches from Illinois
Bnei Hertzeliya basketball players
Canton Charge players
Dallas Mavericks players
Guangdong Southern Tigers players
Guaros de Lara (basketball) players
Junior college men's basketball players in the United States
Liga ACB players
Los Angeles Clippers players
Maccabi Kiryat Gat B.C. players
Murray State Racers men's basketball players
Olimpia Milano players
Pearl River Community College alumni
Power forwards (basketball)
Saski Baskonia players
Seoul SK Knights players
Small forwards
Undrafted National Basketball Association players
Xinjiang Flying Tigers players
Washington Wizards players
Basketball players from Chicago
21st-century African-American sportspeople
20th-century African-American people